Nivaldo Luiz Rossato (born 26 August 1951) is a senior officer of the Brazilian Air Force and its former commander.

Nivaldo Luiz Rossato was born on 26 August 1951 in São Gabriel, Rio Grande do Sul, Brazil.  He has an Air Force career background as a fighting aviation group leader with between 3500 and 4600 hours of flight.  Rossato replaced Air Lieutenant Brigadier Juniti Saito on 30 January 2015 as commander of the Brazilian Air Force.

Dates of rank

Notes

1951 births
Living people
Brazilian Air Force generals
People from São Gabriel